The 2022 Rhode Island Attorney General election took place on November 8, 2022, to elect the Attorney General of Rhode Island. Incumbent Democratic Attorney General Peter Neronha won re-election to a second term.

Democratic primary

Candidates

Nominee
Peter Neronha, incumbent Attorney General

Endorsements

Results

Republican primary

Candidates

Nominee
Charles "Chas" Calenda, former assistant attorney general

Results

General election

Predictions

Results

See also
Rhode Island Attorney General

References

External links
Official campaign websites
Charles Calenda (R) for Attorney Genera
Peter Neronha (D) for Attorney General

Attorney General
Rhode Island
Rhode Island Attorney General elections